Isopropylthioxanthone (ITX) is used as a photoinitiator in printing.

In 2005, traces of isopropyl thioxanthone were found by Italian authorities in babies milk produced by Nestlé.

References 

Thioxanthones
Isopropyl compounds